Tynker is an educational programming platform to help children learn coding skills, including game design, web design, animation and robotics. It includes courses in Minecraft Modding, Minecraft Game Design, Creative Coding, Python and CSS.

Tynker is based on HTML5 and JavaScript, and can be used in browsers, or on tablet computers or smartphones.

History
The Tynker company was founded by Krishna Vedati, Srinivas Mandyam and Kelvin Chong in 2012 in Mountain View, California, United States with funds raised from angel and institutional investors. Tynker for Schools was launched in April 2013, with Tynker for Home the year after. 60 million students, in 90,000 schools, have used Tynker.

In 2018, Tynker partnered with Mattel to produce branded coding experiences with Hot Wheels and Monster High. It also has partnerships with Apple, Google,  Sylvan Learning, BBC Learning, Infosys Foundation USA, Microsoft, PBS and Lego.

In September 2021, Tynker was acquired by Byju's, an Indian multinational educational technology in order to expand in foreign market.

Mobile Applications

In July 2014 Tynker was released for iPad and Android The projects can be accessed from both the web and the tablet and used on either platform.

References 

American educational websites
Byju's
Educational programming languages
Pedagogic integrated development environments
Video game development software
Visual programming languages